Siah Khan Ibn Kashmir Khan was an 8 ft 6 in (259 cm) tall Persian man (the tallest recorded in Asia) with a very large and unusual body. He, who lived in the Zarqan functions of Fars province in the early 20th century in Lepui, also suffered from physical and mental retardation and proteus syndrome.

Biography 
Siah Khan was born in 1913 in the village of Lapui, in the Zarghan district of Fars province.

He grew normally until the age of six, but grew rapidly after that. His family migrated to Shiraz due to Siah Khan's poverty and physical problems, and earned money by displaying their large and unusual child in the streets.

At the end of September 1920, he was rented for some time by a person named Khoshorkhan for 6,000 Tomans to be exhibited in Tehran. Dr. Ghorban, the founder of the Shiraz Medical School, found him in 1931 and provided him with financial and medical support. When he was taken to the hospital, Siah Khan was hospitalized for the rest of his life and eventually died of pneumonia and sepsis in 1938. His skeletal remains are now on public display in a glass case at Shiraz’s Medical School.

Height 

References 

People with gigantism
People with acromegaly
Siah khan
1938 deaths
Deaths from pneumonia in Iran
Siah Khan
20th-century Iranian people
20th-century circus performers
World record holders